Parliamentary elections were held in Chad on 22 December 1963. The country was a one-party state at the time, with the Chadian Progressive Party as the sole legal party. It therefore won all seats in the National Assembly. Voter turnout was 95.41%.

Results

References

Chad
1963 in Chad
Elections in Chad
One-party elections
December 1963 events in Africa